The Digital Preservation Award is an international award sponsored by the Digital Preservation Coalition. The award 'recognises the many new initiatives being undertaken in the challenging field of digital preservation'. It was inaugurated in 2004. It was initially presented as part of the Institute of ConservationConservation Awards. Since 2012 the prize is presented independently. The prize includes a trophy and a cheque. Awards ceremonies have taken place at the British Library, the British Museum and the Wellcome Trust.

Winners and shortlisted entries

2004

Winner 
 The Digital Archive: The National Archives of the United Kingdom

Shortlisted 
 The CAMiLEON Project: University of Leeds & University of Michigan (Special Commendation)
 JISC Continuing Access and Digital Preservation Strategy: Jisc
 Preservation Metadata Extraction Tool: National Library of New Zealand
 Wellcome Library/JISC Web Archiving Project: Wellcome Library & Jisc

2005

Winner 
 PREMIS (Preservation Metadata: Implementation Strategies): PREMIS Working Group

Shortlisted 
 Choosing the optimal digital preservation strategy: Vienna University of Technology
 Digital Preservation Testbed: National Archives of the Netherlands
 Reverse Standards Conversion: British Broadcasting Corporation
 UK Web Archiving Consortium

2007

Winner 
 Active Preservation at The National Archives - PRONOM Technical Registry and DROID file format identification tool: The National Archives of the United Kingdom

Shortlisted 
 LIFE: British Library
 Web Curator Tool software development project: National Library of New Zealand & British Library
 PARADIGM (The Personal Archives Accessible in Digital Media): Bodleian Library, University of Oxford, & John Rylands University Library, University of Manchester
 Digital Repository Audit and Certification: Center for Research Libraries, RLG-OCLC, NARA, Digital Curation Centre, Digital Preservation Europe and NESTOR

2010

Winner 
 The Memento Project: Time Travel for the Web : Old Dominion University and the Los Alamos National Laboratory in the United States

Shortlisted 
 Web Continuity: ensuring access to online government information, from The National Archives UK
 PLATO 3: Preservation Planning made simple from Vienna University of Technology and the PLANETS Project
 The Blue Ribbon Task Force on Sustainable Digital Preservation and Access
 Preserving Virtual Worlds, University of Illinois at Urbana Champaign with Rochester Institute of Technology, University of Maryland, Stanford University and Linden Lab in the United States

2012

Winner - outstanding contribution to teaching and communication in digital preservation in the last 2 years 
 The Digital Preservation Training Programme, University of London Computing Centre

Shortlisted - outstanding contribution to teaching and communication in digital preservation in the last 2 years 
 The Signal, Library of Congress
 Keeping Research Data Safe Project, Charles Beagrie Ltd and partners
 Digital Archaeology Exhibition, Story Worldwide Ltd

Winner - outstanding contribution to research and innovation in digital preservation in the last two years 
 The PLANETS Project  Preservation and Long-term Access through Networked Services, The Open Planets Foundation and partners

Shortlisted - outstanding contribution to research and innovation in digital preservation in the last two years 
 Data Management Planning Toolkit, The Digital Curation Centre and partners
 TOTEM Trustworthy Online Technical Environment Metadata Registry, University of Portsmouth and partners
 The KEEP Emulation Framework, Koninklijke Bibliotheek (National Library of the Netherlands) and partners

Winner - most outstanding contribution to digital preservation in the last decade 
 The Archaeology Data Service at the University of York

Shortlisted - most outstanding contribution to digital preservation in the last decade 
 The International Internet Preservation Consortium
 The National Archives for the PRONOM and DROID services
 The PREMIS Preservation Metadata Working Group for the PREMIS Standard

2014

Winner - OPF Award for Research and Innovation 
 bwFLA Functional Long Term Archiving and Access by the University of Freiburg and partners

Shortlisted - OPF Award for Research and Innovation 
 Jpylyzer by the KB (National Library of the Netherlands) and partners
 The SPRUCE Project by The University of Leeds and partners

Winner - NCDD Award for Teaching and Communications 
 Practical Digital Preservation: a how to guide for organizations of any size  by Adrian Brown

Shortlisted - NCDD Award for Teaching and Communications 
 Skilling the Information Professional by Aberystwyth University
 Introduction to Digital Curation: An open online UCLeXtend Course by University College London

Winner - Award for the Most Distinguished Student Work in Digital Preservation 
 Game Preservation in the UK by Alasdair Bachell, University of Glasgow

Shortlisted - Award for the Most Distinguished Student Work in Digital Preservation 
 Voices from a Disused Quarry by Kerry Evans, Ann MacDonald and Sarah Vaughan,  University of Aberystwyth and partners
 Emulation v Format Conversion by Victoria Sloyan, University College London

Winner - Award for Safeguarding the Digital Legacy 
 Carcanet Press Email Archive, University of Manchester

Shortlisted - Award for Safeguarding the Digital Legacy 
 Conservation and Re-enactment of Digital Art Ready-Made, by the University of Freiburg and Rhizome
 Inspiring Ireland, Digital Repository of Ireland and Partners
 The Cloud and the Cow, Archives and Records Council of Wales

2016

Winner - SSI Award for Research and Innovation 
 NCDD and NDE, ‘Constructing a network of nationwide facilities together.’

Winner - NCDD Award for Teaching and Communications 
 The National Archives and The Scottish Council on Archives: ‘Transforming Archives/Opening Up Scotland’s Archives.’

Winner - Award for the Most Distinguished Student Work in Digital Preservation 
 Anthea Seles, University College London and ‘The Transferability of Trusted Digital Repository Standards to an East African context.’

Winner - The National Archives Award for Safeguarding the Digital Legacy 
 Amsterdam Museum and Partners, ‘The Digital City revives: A case study of web archaeology.’

Winner - DPC Award for the Most Outstanding Digital Preservation Initiative in Industry 
 HSBC, 'The Global Digital Archive'

DPC Fellowship 
 Brewster Kahle, the Internet Archive

Full List of Finalists 2016 
 List of Finalists

2018

Winner - Software Sustainability Institute Award for Research and Innovation

 ePADD, University of Stanford

Shortlisted - Software Sustainability Institute Award for Research and Innovation

 VeraPDF, Open Preservation Foundation
 Contributions towards Defining the Discipline, Sarah Higgins - Aberystwyth University
 Flashback: Preservation of legacy digital collections, British Library

Winner - DPC Award for Teaching and Communications

 The Archivist’s Guide to KryoFlux, Universities of Texas, Duke, Los Angeles, Yale and Emory

Shortlisted - DPC Award for Teaching and Communications

 Evidence-based postgraduate education in digital information management, University College Dublin
 Leren Preserveren (Learning Digital Preservation), Digital Heritage Network and Het Nieuwe Instituut
 Ibadan/Liverpool Digital Curation Curriculum Review Project, Universities of Ibadan and Liverpool

Winner - National Records of Scotland Award for the Most Distinguished Student Work in Digital Preservation

 'Navigating the PDF/A Standard: A Case Study of Theses' by Anna Oates, University of Illinois at Urbana-Champaign

Shortlisted - National Records of Scotland Award for the Most Distinguished Student Work in Digital Preservation

 'Preserving the past: the challenge of digital archiving within a Scottish Local Authority' by Lorraine Murray, University of Glasgow
 'Essay on the record-making and record-keeping issues implicit in Wearables' by Philippa Turner, University of Liverpool

Winner - Open Data Institute Award for the Most Outstanding Digital Preservation Initiative in Commerce, Industry and the Third sector

 Archiving Crossrail - Europe’s largest infrastructure project, Crossrail and Transport for London

Shortlisted - Open Data Institute Award for the Most Outstanding Digital Preservation Initiative in Commerce, Industry and the Third sector

 Music Treasures, Stichting Omroep Muziek (SOM)
 Heritage preservation of contemporary dance and choreography through research and innovation in digital documentation and annotation of creative processes, ICKamsterdam and Motion Bank

Winner - The National Archives Award for Safeguarding the Digital Legacy

 IFI Open Source tools: IFIscripts/ Loopline project, IFI Irish Film Archive

Shortlisted - The National Archives Award for Safeguarding the Digital Legacy

 Cloud-Enabled Preservation of Life in the 20th Century White House, White House Historical Association Digital Library
 Design, Deliver, Embed: Establishing Digital Transfer in Parliament, UK Parliamentary Archives
 Local Authority Digital Preservation Consortium: Dorset History Centre, West Sussex Records Office, Wiltshire & Swindon History Centre

DPC Fellowship 
 Barbara Sierman, KB Netherlands

See also 
 List of computer science awards
 Digital preservation
 Digital Preservation Coalition

References

External links 
 Digital Preservation Awards website
 Conservation Awards website

Digital preservation
Computer science awards